Calliodis is a genus of bugs in the family Lyctocoridae.

References 

 Carayon J., 1989: Constant parthenogenesis proved in two heteroptera the mirid campyloneura virgula and the anthocorid calliodis maculipennis. Annales De La Societe Entomologique De France. 25(4), pages 387-392

External links 
 

 
 Calliodis at insectoid.info

Lyctocoridae
Lyctocoridae genera